Berczy may refer to:
William Berczy, founder of Berczy Village in Upper Canada
William Bent Berczy, a farmer, painter and political figure in Upper Canada
Charles Albert Berczy
Berczy Village, Ontario, the original settlement that grew to become Markham
William Berczy Public School, a school named for the founder of the village